Oceanimonas marisflavi is a Gram-negative, strictly aerobic, rod-shaped and motile bacterium from the genus of Oceanimonas. Oceanimonas marisflavi is able to degrade polycyclic aromatic hydrocarbons.

References 

Aeromonadales
Bacteria described in 2018